Sayan Paratanavong (born 19 December 1951) is a Thai sprinter. He competed in the men's 4 × 100 metres relay at the 1976 Summer Olympics.

References

External links
 

1951 births
Living people
Athletes (track and field) at the 1976 Summer Olympics
Sayan Paratanavong
Sayan Paratanavong
Place of birth missing (living people)
Southeast Asian Games medalists in athletics
Sayan Paratanavong
Sayan Paratanavong